Luxembourg football clubs have participated in European football competitions since Spora Luxembourg took part in the 1956–57 European Cup. In total, 23 different clubs have represented Luxembourg in European competition. Of these, 14 are still in existence while the remaining 9 were merged into a new or existing team.

Statistics

Competitors
Teams listed in bold in the table below are still active in 2019–20 European competitions.

Record by Country of Opposition

Active competitions

European Cup / Champions League

PR = Preliminary round; QR = Qualifying round; R1/R2 = First/Second round; Q1/Q2/Q3 = First/Second/Third qualifying round; R16 = Round of 16

Inter-Cities Fairs Cup / UEFA Cup / Europa League

PR = Preliminary round; QR = Qualifying round; R1/R2 = First/Second round; Q1/Q2/Q3 = First/Second/Third qualifying round; PO: Play-off Round; Grp: Group Stage

Europa Conference League

PR = Preliminary round; QR = Qualifying round; R1/R2 = First/Second round; Q1/Q2/Q3 = First/Second/Third qualifying round; PO: Play-off Round; Grp: Group Stage

Defunct competitions

Cup Winners' Cup

PR = Preliminary round; QR = Qualifying round; R1/R2 = First/Second round

UEFA Intertoto Cup

R1/R2 = First/Second round

Notes

External links
 Luxembourg on UEFA Member Associations

European football clubs in international competitions
Europe